Karum (Akkadian: kārum "quay, port, commercial district", plural kārū, from Sumerian kar "fortification (of a harbor), break-water") is the name given to ancient Old Assyrian period trade posts 
in Anatolia (modern Turkey) from the 20th to 18th centuries BC. The main centre of karum trading was at the ancient town of Kanesh.

History 

Early references to karu come from the Ebla tablets; in particular, a vizier known as Ebrium concluded the earliest treaty fully known to archaeology, known variously as the "Treaty between Ebla and Aššur" or the "Treaty with Abarsal" (scholars have disputed whether the text refers to Aššur or to Abarsal, an unknown location). In either case, the other city contracted to establish karu in Eblaite territory (Syria), among other things. “The word derives from the mercantile quarter of Mesopotamian cities, which were usually just beyond the city walls, at a convenient landing place by the main waterway.”

Sargon the Great (of Akkadia) who likely destroyed Ebla soon afterward, is said in a much-later Hittite account to have invaded Anatolia to punish Nurdaggal, the king of Purushanda (in Anatolia), for mistreating the Akkadian and Assyrian merchant class in the karu there. However, no contemporary source mentions that to be the case.

During the 2nd millennium BC, Anatolia was under the sovereignty of Hatti city-states and later the Hittites. By 1960 BC, Assyrian merchants had established the karu, small colonial settlements next to Anatolian cities, which paid taxes to the rulers of the cities. There were also smaller trade stations which were called mabartū (singular mabartum). The number of karu and mabartu was probably around 20. Among them were Kültepe (Kanesh in antiquity) in modern Kayseri Province; Alişar Hüyük (Ankuva (?) in antiquity) in modern Yozgat Province; and Boğazköy (Hattusa in antiquity) in modern Çorum Province. (However, Alişar Hüyük was probably a mabartum.)  However, after the establishment of the Hittite Empire, the karu disappeared from Anatolian history.

Trade 

In the 2nd millennium BC money was not yet in use, and Assyrian merchants used gold for wholesale trade and silver for retail trade. Gold was considered eight times more valuable than silver. However, another metal, amutum, was even more valuable than gold. It is thought to be the newly-discovered iron and was forty times more valuable than silver.

The most important Anatolian export was copper, and the Assyrian merchants sold tin and clothing to Anatolia.

Legacy 

The name Karum is given to an upscale shopping mall in Çankaya district of modern-day Ankara, Turkey. It is a reference to the presence of karu in Asia Minor since the very early days of history. Another mall in Ankara's Bilkent district is given the name Ankuva. That is also a reference to archaeological discoveries of various karu in Central Anatolia.

References 

25th-century BC establishments
18th-century BC disestablishments
History of Turkey
Archaeology of Turkey
Special economic zones
Trading posts
Assyrian culture
Old Assyrian Empire
Assyrian geography